Kosino-Ukhtomsky District  is an administrative district (raion) of Eastern Administrative Okrug, and one of the 125 raions of Moscow, Russia.

Moscow Districts in Eastern Administrative Okrug city Moscow and the same name Municipalities Moscow intra-city municipal unions. It borders on the Veshnyaki, Vykhino-Zhulebino, Novokosino and Nekrasovka, as well as city Lyubertsy. The area of the district is 1506 hectares.

District Kosino Ukhtomsky consists of three districts—Kozhukhovo, Kosino Kosino and Ukhtomsky. Population: 16,917.

History
According to archaeological evidence, people lived in this area for a very long time. On the territory of Kosino and its surroundings at the end of the last century were discovered 4 groups mounds (of 15 mounds) and 2 Neolithic sites. People are so-called Abashevskaya archaeological culture Bronze Age lived here more in the 2nd millennium BCE. Three groups of mounds located between the White and Holy lakes, excavated, and one group—near Zhulebino—is still waiting for the excavation. Kosinski found in barrows items now in the Museum of Anthropology at Moscow State University.

See also
Administrative divisions of Moscow

References

Notes

Sources

Districts of Moscow
Eastern Administrative Okrug